Judith Alice Clark (born November 23, 1949) is an American activist, convicted felon, and former member of the Weather Underground.  Clark was an armed getaway driver in the Brink's robbery of 1981 in Nanuet, New York. The robbers murdered a security guard and two Nyack, New York police officers. Clark was arrested in October 1981 and convicted of felony murder for her role in the crime. She was sentenced to the maximum penalty allowed by law: Imprisonment for a term of 75 years to life at the Bedford Hills Correctional Facility in New York.

In December 2016, after extensive public and legal support, Governor Andrew Cuomo commuted her sentence to 35 years to life, making her eligible for parole. She was denied parole in April 2017, but granted parole on April 17, 2019, after 37 years in prison. Clark was released on May 10, 2019.

Early life, family, education, and early activism
Clark grew up in a Jewish family with her older brother and parents, Ruth Clark and her husband Joe. Her parents were members of the American Communist Party for many years. As an infant, Clark lived in the Soviet Union from 1950 to 1953. After the family returned home to the U.S., her parents withdrew from the Communist Party, disillusioned with the Soviet Union.

Clark attended the University of Chicago, where she joined Students for a Democratic Society (SDS) and helped to found the Women's Radical Action Project, one of the first organizations of the early women's liberation movement.

Weather Underground involvement
In 1969, Clark participated in the Days of Rage in Chicago, and she was arrested, along with several hundreds of others, for "mob action". Clark jumped bail and was considered a "fugitive from justice". When she was caught, she pleaded guilty and served nine months in Cook County Jail in Chicago.

Two months after her release, there was a prison uprising at Attica. In its wake, Clark was one of the founders of The Midnight Special, a newspaper affiliated with the National Lawyers Guild. Clark was also a member of the Women's Bail Fund and worked in support of political prisoners.

When the May 19th Communist Organization was founded in 1976, Clark became a member, continuing her work as someone who visited political prisoners. She was a named petitioner in the lawsuit Clark v. U.S.A., which challenged the FBI's Cointelpro Program. That suit was eventually settled in the plaintiffs' favor.

Ultimately, May 19 became an isolated remnant of the dwindling "anti-imperialist" movement, and Clark became isolated from society at large.

Brink's robbery

On October 20, 1981, a Brink's armored truck was robbed of $1.6 million by six men at the Nanuet Mall in Nanuet, New York. During the robbery, Peter Paige, a Brink's guard, was killed and guard Joseph Trombino was seriously injured. As the men escaped from the robbery, the van into which they had switched was stopped by a police barricade, and two Nyack police officers, Waverly Brown and Edward O'Grady, were killed during the gun battle that ensued. Clark was the driver of a nearby getaway car into which one of the robbers and David Gilbert jumped after the gun battle. After a car chase, Clark was arrested as she reached for a loaded weapon. Also arrested at the scene was Kathy Boudin, who served 22 years in prison and has been released on parole.

Prosecution and conviction

Clark was charged with three counts of felony murder and was tried together with David Gilbert and Kuwesi Balagoon. They refused to be represented by counsel; instead, they decided to represent themselves. When the three defendants refused to behave in accordance with courtroom decorum, they were banned from the courtroom and placed in cells in the basement; the trial was piped in over a speaker system. No standby counsel was appointed to represent the defendants. All three were convicted of all charges, and each was sentenced to three consecutive 25-year-to-life sentences. Boudin, who was represented by counsel, entered a plea of guilty to a single count of felony murder and received a sentence of 20 years to life.

Incarceration
Clark was incarcerated at the Bedford Hills Correctional Facility in New York.

In September 1985, letters implicating Clark in a possible escape plan were found. She was charged with conspiracy to escape and sentenced to two years in solitary confinement in the Special Housing Unit (SHU). In SHU, Clark began a process of self-reflection, which ultimately led to her renouncing her status as a "political prisoner". Clark publicly apologized for her role in the Brink's robbery in March 2002.

Clark participated in a number of writing groups, including one led for twelve years by poet Hettie Jones. Clark was among the inmates at Bedford Hills featured in the 2003 documentary What I Want My Words to Do to You.

While in prison, Clark also obtained a bachelor's degree and a master's degree, developed an AIDS education program, trained service dogs, and counseled incarcerated mothers.

Habeas corpus petition
In 2006, a United States District Court granted Clark a writ of habeas corpus, reversing her conviction on the grounds that she was deprived of her Sixth Amendment right to counsel. The court ruled: "During the prosecutor's opening statement and during the government's entire direct case against defendants, which spanned at least seven trial days, no one was present in the courtroom to represent Clark's interests. Clark was without assistance of counsel for her defense, in clear abrogation of her Sixth Amendment right to counsel."

However, the United States Court of Appeals for the Second Circuit reversed the district court's decision on the grounds that Clark had procedurally defaulted on her claim by not raising it on direct appeal before the state court, and had knowingly and intelligently waived her Sixth Amendment rights by choosing to represent herself.

Clemency
Represented by attorney Sara Bennett, Clark petitioned Governor Paterson for clemency in 2010. More than 900 people wrote letters in support of her petition, including: Robert Dennison, the former chairperson of parole under Governor Pataki; Elaine Lord, the superintendent of Bedford Hills for the first 22 years of Clark's incarceration; and Frank Olivier, a corrections officer of 23 years who grew up with one of the deceased as a role model.

Lord wrote to the governor, "I watched her change into one of the most perceptive, thoughtful, helpful and profound human beings that I have ever known, either inside or outside of a prison." Dennison wrote that she was "the most worthy candidate for clemency that I’ve ever seen."

Clark, represented by Michael Cardozo, again applied for clemency, and in December 2016, Governor Andrew Cuomo commuted her sentence to 35 years to life. When granting clemency, the governor said Clark had made "exceptional strides in self-development".

Parole
After Governor Andrew Cuomo commuted her sentence to 35 years to life in December 2016, Clark became eligible for parole. She was denied parole in April 2017. According to the Parole Board, Clark was "still a symbol of violent and terroristic crime". More than 10,000 New Yorkers submitted their signatures in opposition to parole for Clark.

Despite opposition from conservative lawmakers, law enforcement groups, and prosecutors Clark was granted parole in a split decision on April 17, 2019 and was released from prison on May 10, 2019. Clark's supporters had "bombarded the State Parole Board with pleas for her release".

In popular culture
Clark was a model for a character in David Mamet's play The Anarchist. Additionally, she was the inspiration for the role of Hannah, performed by Dame Harriet Walter in the 2016 Donmar Warehouse production of Shakespeare's The Tempest.

References

Further reading
 Jacobs, Ron (1997). The Way The Wind Blew: A History of the Weather Underground. New York: Verso. .
 Gilbert, David (2012) Love and Struggle: My Life in SDS, the Weather Underground, and Beyond. Oakland: PM Press. .

External links
 
What I Want My Words to Do to You, PBS, premiered December 16, 2003.

Living people
1949 births
20th-century American Jews
Jewish activists
Jewish socialists
Members of Students for a Democratic Society
Members of the Weather Underground
Place of birth missing (living people)
Opposition to United States involvement in the Vietnam War
American anti–Vietnam War activists
Norwich University alumni
American people convicted of murder
American prisoners sentenced to life imprisonment
People convicted of murder by New York (state)
Prisoners sentenced to life imprisonment by New York (state)
American female murderers
American female criminals
20th-century American criminals
21st-century American Jews